Gyrotaenia microcarpa is a species of plant in the family Urticaceae. It is endemic to Jamaica.

References

microcarpa
Near threatened plants
Endemic flora of Jamaica
Taxonomy articles created by Polbot